The albacore is a species of tuna.

Albacore may also refer to:

Naval vessels
 , various British Royal Navy ships
 Albacore-class gunboat (1855), built for the Royal Navy for the Crimean War
 Albacore-class gunboat (1883), built for the Royal Navy
 , a patrol vessel in commission from 1917 to 1919
 , a submarine which served in the Pacific theater during World War II
 , an experimental submarine in commission from 1953 to 1972

Other uses
 Fairey Albacore, a torpedo bomber built by Fairey Aviation during the Second World War
 Albacore (dinghy), a sailboat racing dinghy